Chau Tsai was a small island off the southern shore of Nam Wan Kok on Tsing Yi Island, Hong Kong. It was also known as Chun Fa Rock (Chung Hue Rock), or Chung Hue Shik in some historical documents. The island was merged with Tsing Yi Island by land reclamation for the construction of the CRC Oil Storage Depot.

See also

 List of islands and peninsulas of Hong Kong
 List of places in Hong Kong

Tsing Yi
Islands of Hong Kong